Victoria Avenue is a divided scenic street in Riverside, California, that cuts through an area referred to as the greenbelt. Originally developed in 1892 to connect the Arlington Heights area to downtown Riverside, the road became a popular tourist attraction because of the many trees and exotic plants used to landscape the route. Beyond the landscaping, the road was surrounded by navel orange groves, the crop that spurred Riverside's growth. Many of the groves still exist today.

External links
 City of Riverside Parks, Recreation & Community Services—descriptive information and video

References

Streets in Riverside County, California
Transportation in Riverside, California
History of Riverside County, California
Landmarks in Riverside, California
National Register of Historic Places in Riverside County, California
Roads on the National Register of Historic Places in California